The United States-China Economic and Security Review Commission (informally, the US-China Commission, USCC) is an independent agency of the United States government. It was established on October 30, 2000, through the Floyd D. Spence National Defense Authorization Act.

The USCC is responsible for providing recommendations based on their findings on bilateral trade with the People’s Republic of China, evaluating national security and trading risks in all industries and conducting research on China’s actions. All these findings are discussed in their hearings, and submitted as an annual report or specific research topics every year.
 
In part due to its small size, the USCC directly reports to Congress and the president - it is not a part of any other department or agency in the federal government. The USCC consists of 12 commissioners who staff it and facilities that were absorbed from the former US Trade Deficit Review Commission. The commissioners are appointed to two-year terms by the Majority and Minority Leaders of the U.S. Senate, and by the Speaker and Minority Leader of the U.S. House of Representatives. The current head of the commission is Carolyn Bartholomew and the Vice Chairman is Robin Cleveland, who are responsible for organizing meetings with other commissioners. Each commissioner is entitled to one vote.

History 
The USCC staff and facilities are from former US Trade Deficit Review Commission by the Floyd D. Spence National Defense Authorization Act of 2001. Since then, the USCC is responsible for overseeing   trade deficit matters with China.

The USCC was created as the US government believes some of the current trades with China were in need of urgent attentions and corrections based on analyses, considering China’s military modernizations, change of trade policy and media and information controls.

Its first annual report in 2002 found that China is and will be a major competitor of the U.S. and also concluded that China as the third-largest trading partner had extremely unbalanced trade relationship. In the following years between 2004 and 2009, the USCC stated that China’s undervalued currency, counterfeiting and piracy, export subsidies and lack of protection of US intellectual property right were continually contributed to a growing trade deficit.

The main focus for the commission is constantly changing around the eight main areas. However, the focused area in the last decade (2010-2020) is national security.

In the 2020 Annual report, the commission stated 10 keys recommendations but many of them are related to security versus purely economic-centered. The USCC argues the main direction of US-China relation will be "A combination of containment and engagement"

Function and Value
Annual Report

The main part of the commission is to submit annual report every year. The USCC fulfills its mission by holding regular meetings with commission members to discuss recent related matters include write full analysis of eight focused parts, which are Energy, American Capital Market, Economic transfers, Regional Economics and Security impacts, US-China Bilateral Programs, Weapon proliferation, World Trade Organization Compliance and Implications of restrictions on speech and information access in China. And provide conclusions and recommendations for legislative and administrative actions.

The public annual report can be download and access by general public, the private annual report is provided to congress and president. The USCC provided its first annual report to Congress in 2002 and did not provide report in 2003. However, 7 research papers were provided in 2003. 18 annual reports were submitted until 2020 so far.

Hearing

Multiple hearings are held every year with commissioners and outside government parties to discuss relevant matters. The first hearing was "China Trade/Sectoral and WTO Issues" on June 14, 2001. The latest hearing was held on April 15, 2021, the topic was "An Assessment of the CCP’s Economic Ambitions, Plans, and Metrics of Success".

Research

Specific research topics are choosing according to the need of congress and popularity among general public, topics can be varying such as economics, trade, technology, military and security.

The latest research is "China’s Health System" in 2021, a few popular research papers are "China’s Corporate Social Credit System" in 2020  and "China’s Internet of Things" in 2018. Those research papers can be parts of the annual reports.

The USCC also entitled to access any information from the United States Department of Defense, the Central Intelligence Agency and any other Federal departments that the commission considers necessary to carry out its duties. Also, government staff including the speakers of Congress, senior federal members and people from military, security, industry and academia who are relevant to the hearings must cooperate with the USCC and attend to the hearings.

Structure
The USCC consists of 12 commission members and 19 staff. Members have the same  responsibility as the Trade Deficit Review Commission. Each commission members are appointed to a two-year term by the Speaker of the House, after consulting with majority of US Senate’s leaders. Members are   not later than 30 days after the date on which each new Congress convenes, and may be reappointed for other additional terms. Each member entitled to one vote for decision-making and voting matters. Members must be US citizens and have expertise in national security and US-China relations.

A chairman and vice chairman are selected from among twelve members by equal voting. An annual report is needed to submit to congress in both classified and unclassified form on a date that not late than 1 December every year. Recommendations  also consider trade and transfer through third countries if necessary.

Commission members and staff
USCC members comprise a commission chairman, vice chairman and ten other members.

Notable past members include Andreas Borgeas, Larry Wortzel, and James M. Talent.

See also 
 Congressional-Executive Commission on China

References

External links 
 

United States national commissions
China–United States economic relations
Foreign relations agencies of the United States